Malavi Rural District is a rural district (dehestan) in the Central District of Pol-e Dokhtar County, Lorestan Province, Iran. At the 2006 census, its population was 8,293, in 2,010 families.  The rural district has 27 villages.

References 

Rural Districts of Lorestan Province
Pol-e Dokhtar County